Group D was one of four groups of national teams competing in the second stage of the 1982 FIFA World Cup. The group's three matches were staged at the Estadio Vicente Calderón in Madrid. The group consisted of three teams advancing from the first group stage: Group 2 runners-up Austria, Group 5 winners Northern Ireland and Group 4 runners-up France.

France topped the group and advanced to the semi-finals.

Qualified teams
The winner of Group 5 and the runners-up of Group 2 and 4 qualified for Group D of the second round.

Standings

Matches

Austria vs France

Austria vs Northern Ireland

France vs Northern Ireland

References

External links
 1982 FIFA World Cup archive
 Spain 1982 FIFA Technical Report: Statistical Details of the Matches pp. 146-149

Group D
Group D
Group D
Group D